Petr Beckmann (November 13, 1924 – August 3, 1993) was a professor of electrical engineering who became a well-known advocate of libertarianism and nuclear power. Later in his life he disputed Albert Einstein's theory of relativity and other accepted theories in modern physics.

Biography
In 1939, when Beckmann was 14, his family fled their home in Prague, Czechoslovakia to escape the Nazis. From 1942 to 1945, he served in a Czech squadron of the Royal Air Force. He worked as a radar mechanic on the newly invented radar systems that helped Britain win the Battle of the Atlantic.   He received a B.Sc. in 1949, a Ph.D. in 1955, and a D.Sc. in 1962, all from Prague's Czech Academy of Sciences in electrical engineering.  He defected to the United States in 1963 and became a Professor (later, Emeritus) of electrical engineering at the University of Colorado. In the United States, he became acquainted with novelist Ayn Rand, a contributing editor to a publication devoted to her ideas, The Intellectual Activist, and a speaker at The Thomas Jefferson School, an intellectual conference of similar purpose.

Beckmann was a prolific author; he wrote several electrical engineering textbooks and non-technical works. By 1968, he had founded Golem Press, which published most of his books. The Golem Press books included The Health Hazards of Not Going Nuclear (1976), which argued in favor of nuclear power during the height of the anti-nuclear movement by making "apples-to-apples" comparisons of the risks of nuclear power with the risks in the same terms (e.g., deaths per terawatt hour) of the alternative power sources. The book also expresses opposition to the Roman culture, Catholicism (and other religions), Nazism, and Communism. He published his own monthly newsletter, Access to Energy, which since September 1993 has been written by biochemist Arthur B. Robinson.

In 1981, he took early retirement with Emeritus status, in order to devote himself fully to what he saw as the defense of science, technology and free enterprise, through his newsletter, Access to Energy. He founded the Golem Press in 1967, publishing more than nine books. He wrote some 60 scientific papers and eight technical books. Beckmann spoke at the 1990 San Francisco Conference of International Society for Individual Liberty (ISIL), where he received a standing ovation for his speech in which he attacked "sham environmentalists".

Beckmann was also a frequent participant in Usenet debates. In them, he claimed to have debunked Albert Einstein's theory of special relativity in his book Einstein Plus Two, as well as in the journal Galilean Electrodynamics, which he also founded.

Books 
 
 
 
 
 
 
 
 
 
 
 
 
  (with coauthor A. Spizzichino)

See also
 Criticism of the theory of relativity
 List of Soviet and Eastern Bloc defectors

References

External links
Einstein Plus Two
Rethinking Relativity, by Tom Bethell (profile of Beckmann and his theories)

20th-century American physicists
Engineering educators
Engineering writers
Mathematics writers
American technology writers
University of Colorado faculty
American libertarians
1924 births
1993 deaths
Czechoslovak defectors
Czechoslovak emigrants to the United States
20th-century American non-fiction writers
Relativity critics